Andrey Movsisyan (born on 27 October 1975) is a Russia-born former Armenian football striker. He was a member of the Armenia national team, participated in 18 international matches and scored 2 goals since his debut in away friendly match against Lithuania on 3 June 2000.

Career statistics

International

Statistics accurate as of match played 13 November 2016

International goals

Honours
 Russian Third League Zone 3 top scorer: 1994 (30 goals).

References

External links

1975 births
Footballers from Moscow
Living people
Russian people of Armenian descent
Russian footballers
Russia under-21 international footballers
Armenian footballers
Armenia international footballers
Armenian expatriate footballers
PFC CSKA Moscow players
FC Saturn Ramenskoye players
FC Moscow players
FC Luch Vladivostok players
Expatriate footballers in Russia
Russian Premier League players
FC Akhmat Grozny players
FC Lokomotiv Nizhny Novgorod players
Association football forwards
FC Spartak-2 Moscow players
FC Sportakademklub Moscow players